Julian Austin may refer to: 

Julian Austin (field hockey) (born 1949), retired Canadian field hockey player
Julian Austin (musician) (born 1963), Canadian musician